Bangladesh National Film Award for Best Female Playback Singer is the highest award for female film playback singers in Bangladesh.

History
Bangladesh National Film Award for best female playback singer has a long history. This is the most prominent award of Bangladeshi playback singing. Since the first film Mukh O Mukhosh (1956), playback started. The ratio of releasing films was relatively very low till 1970. Upon its independence from Pakistan in 1971, the film industry witnessed a remarkable inflation of films and songs. Bangladedesh film industry saw the emergence of honouring the best artistes annually. So, National Award stated to be offered in several categories, including best female singer's category.

The first award was received by Sabina Yasmin, the reigning "Melody Queen of Bangladesh" for Sujan Sakhi. The next year, Runa Laila achieved this feat for The Rain, released in both Urdu and Bengali. It was an unusual exploitation by any singer to achieve a National Award within only two years of debut. However, Runa Laila made this possible, by earning this award in 1976 whereas she made her debut just in 1974. The next year also, Runa won this. Runa Laila made history as she was the first ever Bangladeshi female singer to defend this award successfully (earlier Lata Mangeshkar of India won National Award consecutively in 1973 and 1975, 1974 no award was given). Later on, Sabina Yasmin would make this feat a record four times.
In 1978, Sabina Yasmin again earned National Award for Alangkar, she repeated in 1979 for Sundori and 1980 for Kosai. Thus she became the first and only singer to win a hat trick of National Awards. In 1981, not only in music, but also in every category was refrained from awards. In 1982, Mitali Mukherjee won. She later migrated to India and took Indian citizenship. Thus, she is the only Indian singer to win National Award of Bangladesh. In 1983, award was surrendered for the first time. Sabina Yasmin won two times in a row: 1984 and 1985. Sabina's elder sister, Nilufar Yasmin won this award in 1986. Thus, they became only Bangladeshi siblings to win National award in the same category. Sabina won again consecutive awards in 1986 and 1987. Thus, award went to the same family consecutively five times in the same family, a record to admire. The next year Runa Laila won this award and became the only singer with multiple awards except Sabina. The next year, veteran singer Shahnaz Rahmatullah claimed this award. In 1991 and 1992, Sabina consecutively won National Awards for the last time.  The next two years saw Runa winning a fourth and Farida Parveen, a folk singer and non-playback singer to win award. Kanak Chapa won the awards in 1995, 2001 and 2008. She became one of the only three female singers to win multiple awards, the other two being giants as Sabina Yasmin and Runa Laila.

List of winners

Records and statistics

Multiple wins and nominations
The following individuals received two or more Best Female Playback Singer awards:

See also
 Bangladesh National Film Award for Best Male Playback Singer
 Bangladesh National Film Award for Best Music Director
 Bangladesh National Film Award for Best Music Composer
 Bangladesh National Film Award for Best Lyrics

References

Playback Singer Female
Bangladeshi music awards
Film music awards
Music awards honoring women